Duncan Smart Stewart (8 September 1900 – after 1924) was a Scottish professional footballer who played as a full-back for Sunderland.

References

1900 births
Footballers from Dundee
Scottish footballers
Association football fullbacks
Sunderland A.F.C. players
Southend United F.C. players
English Football League players
Year of death missing